Pseudotmesisternus vestitus is a species of beetle in the family Cerambycidae, and the only species in the genus Pseudotmesisternus. It was described by Fauvel in 1906.

References

Desmiphorini
Beetles described in 1906
Taxa named by Charles Adolphe Albert Fauvel
Monotypic beetle genera